The 2005 Dubai Duty Free Men's and Women's Tennis Championships was the 13th edition of this tennis tournament and was played on outdoor hard courts.  The tournament was part of the International Series Gold of the 2005 ATP Tour and the Tier II series of the 2005 WTA Tour. It took place in Dubai, United Arab Emirates from February 21 through March 7, 2005.

Champions

Men's singles

 Roger Federer defeated  Ivan Ljubičić 6–1, 6–7(6–8), 6–3

Women's singles

 Lindsay Davenport defeated  Jelena Janković 6–4, 3–6, 6–4

Men's doubles

 Martin Damm /  Radek Štěpánek defeated  Jonas Björkman /  Fabrice Santoro 6–2, 6–4

Women's doubles

 Virginia Ruano Pascual /  Paola Suárez defeated  Svetlana Kuznetsova /  Alicia Molik, 6–7(7–9), 6–2, 6–1

External links
Official website
Association of Tennis Professionals (ATP) – tournament profile
WTA Profile

 
2005
Dubai
Dubai